

Gmina Świecie is an urban-rural gmina (administrative district) in Świecie County, Kuyavian-Pomeranian Voivodeship, in north-central Poland.

Villages
Apart from the town of Świecie, Gmina Świecie contains the villages and settlements of Chrystkowo, Czapelki, Czaple, Drozdowo, Dworzysko, Dziki, Ernestowo, Głogówko Królewskie, Gruczno, Kosowo, Kozłowo, Małe Bedlenki, Marianki, Morsk, Niedźwiedź, Nowe Dobra, Polski Konopat, Przechówko, Sartowice, Skarszewo, Sulnówko, Sulnowo, Święte, Topolinek, Wiąg, Wielki Konopat and Wyrwa.

Neighbouring gminas
Gmina Świecie is bordered by the town of Chełmno and by the gminas of Bukowiec, Chełmno, Dragacz, Drzycim, Jeżewo and Pruszcz.

References
Polish official population figures 2006

Swiecie
Świecie County